French National Honor Society may refer to:

 Pi Delta Phi, the French National Honor Society for U.S. college and university undergraduate and graduate students
 Société Honoraire de Français, the French National Honor Society for U.S. high school students